Vengeance is a 2014 direct-to-video film directed by Gil Medina and starring Danny Trejo and Diamond Dallas Page.

Premise
Jack (Danny Trejo) is a retired cop whose wife and daughter are murdered. He is then sent to prison for a crime he did not commit, however, upon being released he seeks revenge.

Cast
 Danny Trejo as Jack Santos
 Dallas Page as Spider Benson
 Jason Mewes as Bobby Mewes
 50 Cent as Black
 Robert John Burke as Det. Ron Banks
 Tech N9ne as Choco
 Baby Bash as Ricardo White
 Donal Logue as Buzz (uncredited)

Development
The first trailer was released on May 22, 2010. The film's director Gil Medina is hoping for the film to receive a theatrical release. Trejo started a campaign for people who give away free copies of the DVD of the film to be given roles in the sequel. The film was released on February 22, 2014 in the United States.

References

External links
 

2014 films
2014 direct-to-video films
American action films
American direct-to-video films
2010s English-language films
2014 action films
2010s American films